Today in Parliament is a British radio programme that covers the daily proceedings of the Palace of Westminster (Houses of Parliament), on BBC Radio 4. When re-broadcast at around 8.30am the next day on longwave (198 LW) and medium wave, it is known as Yesterday in Parliament, similar to The Daily Service. This longwave (LW) signal comes from the Droitwich Transmitting Station. It is produced by BBC News.

History
The programme began on 9 October 1945 at 22.45. It is the only programme that the BBC is required to make under its charter.

In 1978 the public were allowed to hear MPs in parliament.

In 1998 Yesterday in Parliament stopped being broadcast on FM.

Content

The broadcast begins with the Speaker announcing Order, order. It is available daily as a podcast.

Presenters
 Susan Hulme (Scottish)

Audience
Today in Parliament claims to have a regular audience of around 500,000 listeners.

See also
 Shipping Forecast, also broadcast on BBC Radio 4 on LW
 The Week in Westminster
Political podcast

References

External links
 Today in Parliament
 Podcasts
 Parliamentary business
 History of the programme

1945 establishments in the United Kingdom
1945 radio programme debuts
BBC news radio programmes
BBC Radio 4 programmes
Parliament of the United Kingdom
Political podcasts
Works about British politicians